Miles Smith is the name of:

 Miles Smith (bishop) (1554–1624), English theologian, Bishop of Gloucester
 Miles Smith (athlete) (born 1984), American sprinter

See also
 Miles Smith Farm, beef farm in Loudon, New Hampshire